The Municipality of Starše is a municipality in the traditional region of Styria in northeastern Slovenia. The seat of the municipality is the town of Starše. Starše became a municipality in 1994.

Settlements
In addition to the municipal seat of Starše, the municipality also includes the following settlements:
 Brunšvik
 Loka
 Marjeta na Dravskem Polju
 Prepolje
 Rošnja
 Trniče
 Zlatoličje

References

External links

Municipality of Starše on Geopedia
Municipality of Starše website

Starse
1994 establishments in Slovenia